Major General Laura Maria Swaan Wrede, née Swaan (born 16 August 1964) is a Swedish Army officer. She currently serves as the Chief of Home Guard appointed on 30 September 2022. She previously served as regimental commander of the Life Guards between 2017 and 2020 (she was the first female commander of the Life Guards) and as the Deputy Chief of Army from 2020 to 2022.

Career
Swaan Wrede did her military service in Luleå Anti-Aircraft Regiment (Lv 7) in Luleå, where she trained to shoot down aircraft with different weapons systems: Bofors 40 mm L/60 gun, RBS 70 and the MIM-23 Hawk. Swaan Wrede was commissioned as an officer in the Swedish Army in 1987. She was the first woman in the Swedish Armed Forces to receive a scholarship from the Federation of Swedish Finnish Volunteers (Förbundet svenska finlandsfrivilliga) after completing officer training at the Military Academy Karlberg. In the early 1990s, she served in the Scanian Anti-Aircraft Corps (Lv 4) in Ystad.

Swaan Wrede has been in charge of several units throughout her career, mainly at the Life Guards. She has also served several international operations outside Swedish territory, including as a UN observer in the Middle East (UNTSO). She has also served in Lebanon (UNIFIL) and Bosnia (UNPROFOR), and has been involved in international operations in Mali, Somalia, Afghanistan and more. From 2008 Swaan Wrede served as ADC to Victoria, Crown Princess of Sweden.

On 14 December 2014, Swaan Wrede was promoted to colonel and appointed head of department in the Land Component Command (INSS ATS) at the Swedish Armed Forces Headquarters in Stockholm. On 1 November 2017, she assumed the position of regimental commander of the Life Guards, and thus became the first woman regimental commander in Sweden.

She was appointed Deputy Chief of Army on 1 April 2020 and promoted to brigadier general. The Swedish Armed Forces terminated Swaan Wrede's appointment as ADC to Victoria, Crown Princess of Sweden from 1 January 2021.

On 1 October 2022, Swaan Wrede assumed the position of Chief of Home Guard and was simultaneously promoted to major general.

Dates of rank
14 December 2014 – Colonel
1 April 2020 – Brigadier general
1 October 2022 – Major general

Awards and decorations

Swedish
   King Carl XVI Gustaf's Jubilee Commemorative Medal II (23 August 2013)
   Crown Princess Victoria and Prince Daniel's Wedding Commemorative Medal (8 June 2010)
   H. M. The King's Medal, 8th size gold (silver-gilt) medal worn on the chest suspended by the Order of the Seraphim ribbon
   For Zealous and Devoted Service of the Realm
   Swedish Armed Forces Conscript Medal
   Swedish Armed Forces International Service Medal
   Military Academy Karlberg Medal of Merit (Militärhögskolan Karlbergs förtjänstmedalj)
   Home Guard Bronze Medal (2019)

Foreign
   Commander of the Order of the Lion of Finland
   United Nations Medal (UNIFIL)
   United Nations Medal (UNPROFOR)
   United Nations Medal (UNTSO) (award numeral 2)
 etc

References

1964 births
Living people
Swedish Army major generals
21st-century Swedish military personnel
Female generals and flag officers of Sweden